Chillerton and Gatcombe is a civil parish on the Isle of Wight, England, including the two villages of Chillerton and Gatcombe. It was previously the parish of Gatcombe but was renamed in 2013 under a 2011 order of Isle of Wight Council.

It has a parish council, the lowest form of local government.

The population of the parish in the 2011 census was 422.

 there are 19 listed buildings in the parish, of which St Olave's Church, Gatcombe is at grade I and Gatcombe House and Sheat Manor at grade II*.

References

External links
Parish Council website

Civil parishes in the Isle of Wight